Rajani Duganna is an Indian politician and former Mayor of Mangalore City Corporation. She took office on 26 February 2010, with B. Rajendra Kumar as Deputy Mayor. She is the fifth female to have become mayor of the city corporation, as well as its 24th mayor, since the corporation's establishment in 1984. She is a BILLAVA (POOJARY) and belongs to the Bharatiya Janata Party (BJP). Duganna was succeeded as Mayor by her cousin Praveen Kumar on 28 February 2011.

References 

Living people
Bharatiya Janata Party politicians from Karnataka
Mayors of Mangalore
Women mayors of places in Karnataka
Politicians from Mangalore
Mangaloreans
21st-century Indian women politicians
21st-century Indian politicians
Year of birth missing (living people)
Women members of the Karnataka Legislative Assembly